Panthous is a genus of assassin bugs (family Reduviidae), in the subfamily Harpactorinae.

Species
 Panthous bimaculatus Distant, 1903
 Panthous cocalus Distant, 1882
 Panthous contrarius Miller, 1941
 Panthous daedalus Stål, 1863
 Panthous ectinoderoides Bergroth, 1913
 Panthous excellens Stål, 1863
 Panthous icarus Stål, 1863
 Panthous illustris Miller, 1941
 Panthous limboguttatus Reuter, 1881
 Panthous minos Breddin, 1900
 Panthous nigriceps Reuter, 1881
 Panthous ochromelas Stål, 1863
 Panthous ruber Hsiao, 1979
 Panthous speculator Miller, 1948
 Panthous talus Distant, 1882
 Panthous tarsatus Distant, 1903
 Panthous theseus Breddin, 1900
 Panthous vegetus Miller, 1941

References

Reduviidae
Cimicomorpha genera